Latanoprostene bunod (trade name Vyzulta) is an ophthalmic drug approved in the United States in 2017 for the reduction of intraocular pressure in patients with open-angle glaucoma or ocular hypertension. It targets the trabecular meshwork directly.

References 

Ophthalmology drugs
Prostaglandins
Triols